Roberto Barzanti (born 24 January 1939 in Monterotondo Marittimo) is an Italian politician.

Member of the Italian Socialist Party of Proletarian Unity, Barzanti was elected Mayor of Siena on 2 December 1969.

He joined the Italian Communist Party in 1974 and was elected at the European Parliament in 1984, serving for three legislatures (II, III, IV). He was Vice-President of the European Parliament from 4 January 1992 to 18 July 1994.

Honour 
 : Knight Grand Cross of the Order of Merit of the Italian Republic (28 july 2010)

See also
1984 European Parliament election
1989 European Parliament election
1994 European Parliament election
List of mayors of Siena

References

External links
 

1939 births
Living people
Mayors of Siena
Democratic Party (Italy) politicians
Democrats of the Left politicians
Democratic Party of the Left politicians
Italian Communist Party politicians
Italian Socialist Party of Proletarian Unity politicians
Scuola Normale Superiore di Pisa alumni
Knights Grand Cross of the Order of Merit of the Italian Republic